The 4th Aerobic Gymnastics European Championships was held in Coimbra, Portugal, October 27–30, 2005.

Results

Medal table

References
Results (PDF file)

Aerobic Gymnastics European Championships
2005 in gymnastics
International gymnastics competitions hosted by Portugal
2005 in Portuguese sport